Seven Islands Land Company is a privately held land and timber management holding company based in Bangor, Maine.

Pingree family
Seven Islands manages approximately 1 million acres (4,000 km2) of forest in the North Maine Woods, in northern and western Maine, for dozens of members of the Pingree family, descendants of wealthy Salem, Massachusetts shipping magnate David Pingree (nicknamed the "Merchant Prince of Salem"). He began to acquire the Maine lands more than 150 years ago.

In 1997, the family's Seven Islands Land Company is believed to be the fourth largest private landowner in the United States, according to an analysis by Worth magazine. Seven Islands is integrally tied to another family entity, Pingree Associates. As of 2017, the Pingree family is 10th largest private landowner in the United States.

History
The Pingree family holdings date back to 1820, when Maine became a state.  In that year, Pingree, correctly believing that his city would cease to be a major port, started purchasing vast tracts of softwoods and hardwoods as an investment hedge.

Over the next 150 years, the Pingree holdings would reach 1 million acres (4,000 km2) and include over 2,000 miles (3200 km) of shore frontage along major rivers and streams, more than 100 lakes, 24,800 acres (100 km2) of deer yards and 72,000 acres (290 km2) of wetland habitat.

Development and conservation
Development on the Pingree's Seven Islands Land Company property, much of which surrounds Baxter State Park and the Allagash River, is heavily restricted.

In 2001, Pingree Associates announced they had negotiated an arrangement with the New England Forestry Foundation to sell undevelopable easements on three-quarters of their nearly 1 million acres (4,000 km2). The remaining 250,000 acres (1,000 km2) were made available for limited development.

The agreement created the largest conservation easement in American history, effectively putting an area larger than the state of Rhode Island off-limits to development.

See also

Chellie Pingree
Hannah Pingree
Hazen S. Pingree

References

External links
 

American landowners
Forests of Maine
Forest products companies of the United States
Holding companies of the United States
North Maine Woods
Companies based in Bangor, Maine
Geography of Aroostook County, Maine
Geography of Penobscot County, Maine
Geography of Piscataquis County, Maine